Afsana is a 1970 Pakistani Urdu romantic drama film directed by Luqman. The film starred Waheed Murad, Deeba, Rozina, Nanha, and others. One of the film's playback songs, "Yun Kho Gaye Tere Piyar Mein Hum" (vocalized by Mujeeb Alam) was a hit track of the time.

Plot
A modest son of a businessman, Nasir, develops feelings for his classmate girl, Nahid, who comes from a low-income household. Both of their parents approve of their marriage after a brief drama. After returning from his wedding with Nahid, Nasir dies in a car accident and Nahid gets injured. Nasir's father designates his daughter-in-law as the successor while still alive. Here comes a criminal named Zafar, who resembles Nasir. He starts living with Nahid and her mother in Nasir's home under the guise of being a distant cousin of Nasir. Actually, Nasir's former colleague Ghazala, who was jealous of Nasir and Nahid'''s marriage, gives him the role to take her revenge. 

Cast
 Deeba — as Naheed Waheed Murad — in dual roles as Nasir and Zafar Rozina — as Ghazala Nanha — as Nasir's friend Badar Kemal Irani — as Nasir's father
 Shakir
 Asha Posley
 Saqi
 Waheeda Khan
 Niggo
 Rajni
 Fattu
 Luqman

Music and soundtracks
The music of Afsana was composed by Nashad and lyrics were penned by Tanveer Naqvi:
 Yun Kho Geye Teray Pyar Mein Hum, Ab Hosh Mein Aana Mushkil Hay... Singer(s): Mujeeb Alam
 Gila To Yeh Hay Keh Kyun Hum Nay Tujh Say Pyar Kiya... Singer(s): Mala
 Hum Aap Kay Hayn Janab-e-Aali, Na Ham Say Itna Hijab Kijiye... Singer(s): Ahmad Rushdi, Mala
 Hum Ko Tumharay Sar Ki Qasm, Pyar Tumhen Kartay Hayn Hum... Singer(s): Ahmad Rushdi
 Hum Ko Tumharay Sar Ki Qasm, Pyar Tumhen Kartay Hayn Hum... Singer(s): Mala
 Na Ham Tum Sya Juda, Na Tum Ham Say Juda Ho''... Singer(s): Ahmad Rushdi

Release and box office
Afsana was released on 6 February 1970. It ran for 28 weeks at the Karachi's theaters.

References

1970 films
Pakistani musical films
1970s Urdu-language films
1970 romantic drama films
Pakistani romantic drama films
Urdu-language Pakistani films